KIAA1549-like is a protein that in humans is encoded by the KIAA1549L gene.

References

Further reading 

Genes
Human proteins